Ursa Major Filament is a galaxy filament. The filament is connected to the CfA Homunculus, a portion of the filament forms a portion of the "leg" of the Homunculus.

See also
 Abell catalogue
 Large-scale structure of the universe
 Supercluster

References

Galaxy filaments
Large-scale structure of the cosmos